Drosay is a commune in the Seine-Maritime department in the Normandy region in northern France.

Geography 

Population 

In 2019, the number of housing units in Drosay was 124. Of these, 76% were main residences, 18% were secondary homes, and 6% were vacant.

Places of interest 
 The church of St.Martin, dating from the thirteenth century.
 The chapel of St.Roch, dating from the eleventh century.

See also 
 Communes of the Seine-Maritime department

References 

Communes of Seine-Maritime